

Medalists

Qualification

Qualification rule: qualification standard 14.30m or at least best 8 qualified

Final

Triple jump at the World Athletics Indoor Championships
Triple Jump Women
2008 in women's athletics